Westside High School is a public high school located in the West Augusta area of Augusta, Georgia, United States. It is operated by the Richmond County School System. Its current principal is William Smith.

Student activities

Athletics

Sports teams include baseball, wrestling (2011 wrestling region champs), soccer, football, track & field, swimming, cross country, golf, tennis, kickboxing, volleyball, disc golf, and horseshoes.

The mascot of the school is "Pat" the Patriot.

Notable alumni

Graduation ceremonies
2013 Graduation Ceremony - WJBF-TV ABC
2014 Graduation Ceremony - WJBF-TV ABC

Alumni class organizations
  Westside Class of 1980
  Westside Class of 1987

References

External links
Westside High School | Homepage
Great Schools - Westside High School
U.S. News & World Report - Westside High School
Westside High School, Augusta, GA | Facebook
Westside High School - The Augusta Chronicle
Westside High School on Twitter
 Westside High School on Real GM Basketball
Westside High School on The Baseball Cube

High schools in Richmond County, Georgia
Public high schools in Georgia (U.S. state)